William Inglis (8 March 1832 – 12 January 1896) was an Australian auctioneer and stock agent.

He was born in Sydney to merchant Thomas Inglis and Catherine Ross. He was a whaler and a goldminer in the Ovens Valley before returning to his parents' property near Camden. On 3 March 1858 he married Flora McKinnon. He entered into an auctioneering partnership with Joseph Butler in 1867, which he ran alone from 1877. It continues today as William Inglis and Sons.

He conducted his business between Castlereagh and Pitt streets, where he had a "horse bazaar". He ran unsuccessfully for the New South Wales Legislative Assembly in 1889 as a Protectionist candidate for Balmain. A banquet was given in his honour in 1895. Known for his trademark top hat, Inglis died at his home in Leichhardt. Two of his sons, John and William, followed him in the auctioneering trade.

References

1832 births
1896 deaths
Australian auctioneers
19th-century Australian businesspeople